Tan Si (born 6 January 1987) is a Chinese footballer currently playing as a striker.

Club career
He would make his league debut coming on as a late substitute against Changsha Ginde F.C. in a 3-0 victory on October 30, 2005. Several weeks later he will score his first senior match goal against Shanghai Shenhua on November 15, 2005 in the Chinese Super League in 1-1 draw. Under the club's manager Pei Encai, Tan would gradually start to establish himself within the team, however due to a run of bad results Pei Encai would leave the club and his replacement Chen Fangping would decide to allow Tan to leave the club at the end of the 2007 Chinese Super League season.

Tan Si would transfer to second tier club Jiangsu Sainty and be reunited with his previous manager Pei Encai, along with his teammates Ren Yongshun, Guo Mingyue and Li Zhuangfei in early 2008. He would gradually start to establish himself within the team and go on to score his first goal for the club in a league game on July 5, 2008 as well as also scoring his first ever hat-trick against Harbin Yiteng F.C. in a 5-2 win. Going on to become a vital member of the team Tan would go on to play in thirteen games and score ten goals to help Jiangsu Sainty in their promotion to the Chinese Super League. After winning the 2008 Chinese League One title Tan Si and Jiangsu Sainty enjoyed an impressive start to the 2009 Chinese Super League season, which saw him included in Gao Hongbo's senior team squad for several friendlies.

On 26 February 2015, Tan transferred to China League Two side Nanjing Qianbao on a free transfer.

On 9 March 2018, Tan transferred to League Two side Hunan Billows.

Career statistics 
Statistics accurate as of match played 31 December 2020.

Honours

Club
Jiangsu Sainty
 China League One: 2008

References

External links
TAN SI at Soccerway.com

1987 births
Living people
Sportspeople from Yangzhou
Chinese footballers
Footballers from Jiangsu
Wuhan Guanggu players
Jiangsu F.C. players
Wuhan F.C. players
Hunan Billows players
Chinese Super League players
China League One players

Association football forwards